Harry Potter and the Methods of Rationality (HPMOR) is a Harry Potter fan fiction by Eliezer Yudkowsky, published on FanFiction.Net. It adapts the story of Harry Potter to explain complex concepts in cognitive science, philosophy, and the scientific method. Yudkowsky published HPMOR as a serial from February 28, 2010 to March 14, 2015, totaling 122 chapters and about 660,000 words.

Yudkowsky wrote HPMOR to promote rationality skills he advocates on his community blog LessWrong. His reimagining supposes that Harry's aunt Petunia Evans married an Oxford professor and homeschooled Harry in science and rational thinking. As such, Harry "enters the wizarding world armed with Enlightenment ideals and the experimental spirit." The fan fiction spans one year, covering Harry's first year in Hogwarts. HPMOR has inspired other works of fan fiction, art, and poetry.

Plot 
In this fan fiction's alternate universe to the Harry Potter series, Lily Potter magically made Petunia Evans prettier, letting her abandon Vernon Dursley and marry Oxford professor Michael Verres. They adopt Harry Potter as Harry James Potter-Evans-Verres, with him and Michael unaware of his heritage, and homeschool him in science and rationality. When Harry turns 11, Petunia and Professor McGonagall inform him and Michael about the wizarding world and Harry's defeat of Lord Voldemort. Harry becomes irritated over wizarding society's inconsistencies and backwardness. When boarding the Hogwarts Express, circumstances make Harry befriend Draco Malfoy over Ron Weasley. Harry also befriends Hermione Granger over their scientific inclinations.

At Hogwarts, the Sorting Hat sends Hermione to Ravenclaw and Draco to Slytherin. Harry talks to it and almost goes to Slytherin, yet ultimately enters Ravenclaw. As school begins, Harry feels patronized by McGonagall and Headmaster Dumbledore, bonds with Professor Quirrell, and tests magic through the scientific method with Draco and Hermione. By testing timeless physics, Harry invents partial Transfiguration, a magical technique to transform parts of wholes. Quirrell starts a program involving "student armies" with Harry, Draco, and Hermione as first-year generals.

After winter break, Hogwarts procures a Dementor to teach students the Patronus charm. Though Hermione and Harry initially fail, Harry recognizes Dementors as shadows of death. Resolving to defeat death, he invents the True Patronus charm and destroys the Dementor. After learning the regular Patronus, Draco discovers Harry can speak Parseltongue. Quirrell reveals himself as a snake Animagus to Harry and makes him help free Bellatrix Black from Azkaban, leaving her hidden. Dumbledore learns about the prison break but not the participants, leading him to confine Harry to Hogwarts as a precaution.

After army battles, bullying incidents, and hearing a phoenix's call, Hermione establishes the organization S.P.H.E.W. to protest misogyny in heroism. Suddenly, she gets accused of Draco's attempted murder. Harry pays his fortune to Lucius Malfoy, Draco's father, to save Hermione from Azkaban, after which Lucius withdraws Draco from Hogwarts. Harry and the staff theorize that Quirrell is David Monroe, a long-missing opponent of Voldemort. Not long after, a mountain troll enters Hogwarts and kills Hermione before Harry manages to kill it. Grieving, Harry vows to resurrect Hermione and steals her body. Harry absolves the Malfoys of guilt in Hermione's murder in exchange for Lucius returning his money, exonerating Hermione, and sending Draco back to Hogwarts.

Quirrell starts eating unicorns to stave off death from a supposed "disease." Near the end of the year, he captures Harry, revealing himself as Voldemort's spirit possessing Quirrell and how he framed Hermione, then murdered her with the troll. He threatens to massacre students unless Harry helps him steal the Philosopher's Stone, an artifact for performing true transmutation, as Transfiguration is otherwise temporary. Harry agrees after Voldemort promises to resurrect Hermione, and they magically coax the Stone from the Mirror of Erised in Hogwarts. When Dumbledore appears and tries to banish Voldemort outside time, Voldemort threatens Harry, forcing Dumbledore to seal himself instead. Voldemort's spirit abandons Quirrell and embodies using the Stone, after which he and Harry resurrect Hermione with the power of the Stone and Harry's True Patronus. Voldemort ritualistically murders Quirrell to give Hermione a Horcrux and the magic of a mountain troll and unicorn, rendering her near-immortal before summoning Lucius and his other Death Eaters. Knowing a prophecy predicts that Harry will destroy the world, Voldemort forces Harry into a magical oath never to risk doing so before ordering Harry's murder. Cornered, Harry kills every Death Eater at once with partial Transfiguration, stuns Voldemort, wipes most of his memories, and turns him into a jewel on Harry's ring. Harry claims the Philosopher's Stone and stages a scene looking like "David Monroe" died defeating Voldemort and resurrected Hermione.

In the battle's aftermath, Harry receives Dumbledore's letters and learns that Dumbledore has gambled the world's future on him due to prophecies and arranged for Harry to inherit his positions and assets. With Voldemort defeated, Harry helps a grieving Draco find his missing mother, Narcissa Malfoy, whom Draco believed Dumbledore had murdered. Harry plans with the resurrected Hermione to overhaul wizarding society by destroying Azkaban and using the Philosopher's Stone to grant everyone immortality.

Background 
According to Yudkowsky, "I'd been reading a lot of Harry Potter fan fiction at the time the plot of HPMOR spontaneously burped itself into existence inside my mind, so it came out as a Harry Potter story. ... There's a large number of potential readers who would enter at least moderately familiar with the Harry Potter universe." He states that his work on rationality "informs every shade of how the characters think, both those who are allegedly rational and otherwise". He also used it to assist the launch of the Center for Applied Rationality, which teaches courses based on his work. David Whelan of Vice described HPMOR'''s version of Harry Potter as "a miniature Ravenclaw Spock with a taste for deductive reasoning" and said the book "reads like the originals after a lifetime spent playing Nintendo's Brain Training."

Reception
Critical responseHarry Potter and the Methods of Rationality is highly popular on FanFiction.Net, though it has also caused significant polarization among readers. In 2011, Daniel D. Snyder of The Atlantic recorded how HPMOR "caused uproar in the fan fiction community, drawing both condemnations and praise" on online message boards "for its blasphemous—or brilliant—treatment of the canon." In 2015, David Whelan of Vice described HPMOR as "the most popular Harry Potter book you've never heard of" and claimed, "Most people agree that it's brilliantly written, challenging, and—curiously—mind altering."HPMOR is "Widely considered as one of the best fanfics ever written," according to Rhys McKay of Who. Hugo Award-winning science fiction author David Brin positively reviewed HPMOR for The Atlantic in 2010, saying, "It's a terrific series, subtle and dramatic and stimulating… I wish all Potter fans would go here, and try on a bigger, bolder and more challenging tale." In 2014, American politician Ben Wikler lauded HPMOR on The Guardian as "the #1 fan fiction series of all time," saying it was "told with enormous gusto, and with emotional insight into that kind of mind," and comparing Harry to his friend Aaron Swartz's skeptical attitude. Writing for The Washington Post, legal scholar William Baude praised HPMOR as "the best Harry Potter book ever written, though it is not written by J.K. Rowling" in 2014 and "one of my favorite books written this millennium" in 2015. In 2015, Vakasha Sachdev of Hindustan Times described HPMOR as "a thinking person's story about magic and heroism" and how "the conflict between good and evil is represented as a battle between knowledge and ignorance," eliciting his praise. In 2017, Carol Pinchefsky of Syfy lauded HPMOR as "something brilliant" and "a platform on which the writer bounces off complex ideas in a way that's accessible and downright fun." In a 2019 interview for The Sydney Morning Herald, young adult writer Lili Wilkinson said that she adores HPMOR; according to her, "It not only explains basically all scientific theory, from economics to astrophysics, but it also includes the greatest scene where Malfoy learns about DNA and has to confront his pureblood bigotry."

 Accolades 
The audio version of HPMOR was a Parsec Awards finalist in 2012 and 2015.

 Translations 

 Russian 
In July 2018, a crowdfunding campaign for printing a three-volume Russian translation of HPMOR was launched on the website Planeta.ru. The  goal (approximately ) was reached within the first 30 hours. The campaign ended on the 30th of September with  collected (approximately ) and became the highest funded Russian crowdfunding project, although this record was broken the day after. This is the biggest HPMOR publication project: the book was published by fans many times, but the book's circulation was lower. According to Mikhail Samin, the founder of the project, "Yudkowsky accepted the idea positively", but the popularity of the campaign surprised him. Yudkowsky wrote an introduction exclusively for the Russian printing. The book was compiled by Lin Lobaryov, the former lead editor of Mir Fantastiki magazine. Extra books will be sent to libraries and presented to school Science Olympiad winners.

After the success of the crowdfunding project, Russian publishing house Eksmo asked Rowling's agents for permission to publish HPMOR in Russia officially, but Rowling has refused use of fanfics of her Wizarding World for commercial purposes.

 Other 
HPMOR has Czech, Chinese, French, German, Hebrew, Italian, Japanese, Norwegian, Spanish, Swedish, and Ukrainian translations.

 See also 

 My Immortal and Hogwarts School of Prayer and Miracles, two near-universally condemned Harry Potter fan fictions
 All the Young Dudes, a similarly praised Harry Potter fan fiction

References

External links
 
 The Methods of Rationality Podcast'' (Full cast audiobook available as a podcast)

2010 works
Fiction about personifications of death
Harry Potter fan fiction
Literature first published in serial form
Modern philosophical literature
Transhumanist books
Works set in the 1990s